Arhopala irregularis  is a butterfly in the family Lycaenidae. It was described by George Thomas Bethune-Baker in 1903. It is  found  in Sulawesi and Banggai in the Australasian realm.

References

External links
 Arhopala at Markku Savela's Lepidoptera and Some Other Life Forms

Arhopala
Butterflies described in 1893
Taxa named by George Thomas Bethune-Baker
Butterflies of Indonesia